The Controlled Environment Agriculture Center (CEAC) is an agricultural research facility at the University of Arizona. Research projects focus on automated greenhouse technologies, fertigation, and hydroponics.

See also
Controlled-environment agriculture (CEA)
Hydroponics

External links
 University of Arizona CEA Program

Agricultural research institutes in the United States
Agriculture and the environment
University of Arizona
Research institutes in Arizona